Khoobsurat  is a 2016 Pakistani drama television series aired on Urdu 1, produced by Kashif Mirza under production banner A&F Production. Khoobsurat is based on a love triangle between three characters, Mahrukh, Burhan and Meher.

Plot summary 

The series revolves around an unrequited love story. Meharma and Burhan are childhood lovers. However, he belongs to a middle-class family and Nusrat (Mehru's mother) wants to marry her daughter to a rich guy. Burhan is an unemployed guy who apply for a job where only unmarried employees are required. However, he lies and gets the job despite being married. Things get complicated between him and his boss Mahrukh when she falls for her.

Cast
Azfar Rehman as Burhan
Mahnoor Baloch as Mahrukh 
Zarnish Khan as Meharma (Mehru)
Faisal Rehman as Ahmed Shah: Mahrukh's husband 
Asma Abbas as Nusrat: Mehru's mother
Qazi Wajid as Ehsaan: Mahrukh's father
Khalid Butt as Mehboob: Zara, Burhan and Rabia's father
Salma Shaheen as Sabira:Zara, Burhan and Rabia's mother
Hajra Khan as Zara: Burhan's elder sister    
Sabeeka Imam as Farah: Mahrukh's friend
Maria Malik as Rabia: Burhan's younger sister
Arsalan Mughal as Ashfaq Ghumman: Mehru's fiance
Anas Ali Imran as Safeer: Burhan's friend
Zeeshan as Saeed: Zara's husband
Jahanzaib as Asim: Rabia's husband
Sofia Khan as Bilqees: Rabia's mother-in-law 
Eshal Syed as Sarah: Meharma's elite friend
Humaira Asghar: Burhan and Safeer co-worker

Production 

The sereis marked the acting comeback of Baloch. Rehman revealed to The News that his character in the series falls in love with an older woman

References

2018 Pakistani television series debuts
2019 Pakistani television series endings